HMCS Fortune was a  built for the Royal Canadian Navy. Named for Fortune Bay, located in Newfoundland, the vessel served in the Royal Canadian Navy for ten years before being sold for commercial purposes. Renamed MV Edgewater Fortune she saw service as a commercial yacht.

Design
The Bay class were designed and ordered as replacements for the Second World War-era minesweepers that the Royal Canadian Navy operated at the time.

They had a complement of 38 officers and ratings. The Bay-class minesweepers were powered by two GM 12-cylinder diesel engines driving two shafts creating . The ships were armed with one Bofors 40 mm gun and were equipped with minesweeping gear.

Service
Initially named Belle Isle, Fortune was laid down on 24 April 1952 by Victoria Machinery Depot at Victoria with the yard number 51 and launched on 14 April 1953. The minesweeper was commissioned on 3 November 1954 with the hull identification number 151.

Fortune joined the Second Canadian Minesweeping Squadron after commissioning. In November 1955, the Second Canadian Minesweeping Squadron was among the Canadian units that took part in one of the largest naval exercises since the Second World War off the coast of California.

After nine years of naval service, including acting as the flagship of the Second Canadian Minesweeping Squadron during the Cuban Missile Crisis, Fortune was decommissioned on 28 February 1964. Put up for auction by the Crown Assets Corporation, the ship was then sold into mercantile service. She was initially known as Greenpeace Two and used in an unsuccessful attempt to stop nuclear testing in the Aleutians in November 1971. The vessel was then refitted as the charter yacht MV Edgewater Fortune and was used for short cruises along the coast of British Columbia. She was also occasionally used for fishing, and for school trips to learn about the wildlife on the coast and in the water. Subsequently, the ship was turned into a  floating home in Vancouver.

References

Notes

Citations

Bibliography

External links
 HMCS Fortune today
 Ship’s Badge HMCS Fortune
 MV Edgewater Fortune homepage 

 

Minesweepers of the Royal Canadian Navy
Bay-class minesweepers
1953 ships
Cold War minesweepers of Canada
Ships built in British Columbia